Quingentole is a comune (municipality) in the Province of Mantua in the Italian region Lombardy, located about  southeast of Milan and about  southeast of Mantua.

Quingentole borders the following municipalities: Borgo Mantovano, Quistello, Schivenoglia, Serravalle a Po, Sustinente.

References

Cities and towns in Lombardy